Thylacodes squamigerus, common name the scaled wormsnail, is a species of sea snail, a marine gastropod mollusk in the family Vermetidae, the worm snails. This species was previously known as Serpulorbis squamigerus.

This worm snail lives in the Eastern Pacific Ocean.

This species is often cemented into colonies. It has no operculum.

References

Vermetidae
Gastropods described in 1856
Taxa named by Philip Pearsall Carpenter